Zobnin is a surname. Notable people with the surname include:

 Aleksandr Zobnin (born 1989), Russian footballer, brother of Roman
 Roman Zobnin (born 1994), Russian footballer

Russian-language surnames